Oxysterol-binding protein-related protein 2 is a protein that in humans is encoded by the OSBPL2 gene.

This gene encodes a member of the oxysterol-binding protein (OSBP) family, a group of intracellular lipid receptors. Most members contain an N-terminal pleckstrin homology domain and a highly conserved C-terminal OSBP-like sterol-binding domain, although some members contain only the sterol-binding domain. This encoded protein contains only the sterol-binding domain. In vitro studies have shown that the encoded protein can bind strongly to phosphatic acid and weakly to phosphatidylinositol 3-phosphate, but cannot bind to 25-hydroxycholesterol. The protein associates with the Golgi apparatus. Transcript variants encoding different isoforms have been described.

References

Further reading